K64 or K-64 may refer to:

K-64 (Kansas highway), a state highway in Kansas
HMS Hollyhock (K64), a UK Royal Navy ship
Soviet submarine K-64
64K intro